The Asociación de Guías Scouts de Bolivia (AGSB, Girl Guide Association of Bolivia) is the national Guiding organization of Bolivia. It serves 390 members (as of 2006). Guiding was introduced to Bolivia in 1915. Founded in 1958, the girls-only organization became an associate member of the World Association of Girl Guides and Girl Scouts in 1966 and a full member in 1978.

See also
 Asociación de Scouts de Bolivia

References

World Association of Girl Guides and Girl Scouts member organizations
Scouting and Guiding in Bolivia
Youth organizations established in 1958
1958 establishments in Bolivia